Jacquinia keyensis, commonly called Joewood, is a woody plant in the primrose family. It is native to the West Indies, where it is widespread on many islands. Its natural habitat is coastal strand, often on coral exposures with salt spray.

It is a shrub or small tree with thick, saponaceous, evergreen leaves. It produces white flowers, primarily in the summer and fall.

Jacquinia keyensis is listed as "Threatened" in the state of Florida.

References

Primulaceae
Saponaceous plants